George Brent (1904–1979) was an Irish-American stage, film, and television actor. George Brent may also refer to:

George Brent (politician) (died c. 1699), the colonial Virginia planter, lawyer, and politician
George William Brent (1821–1872), Virginia lawyer, Confederate and politician
George Brent (judge) (1817–1881), justice of the Maryland Court of Appeals

See also
George Brett (born 1953), baseball player